Forest National (French) or Vorst Nationaal (Dutch) is a multi-purpose arena located in the municipality of Forest in Brussels, Belgium. The arena can hold more than 8,000 people. It hosts indoor sporting events as well as concerts done by a wide variety of artists.

The arena, which opened in 1970, offers between 2,500 and 8,000 seats, depending on the event and is a member of European Arenas Association (EAA). Known for its circular interior, it is owned by the Music Hall Group and operated by the Sportpaleis Groep.

History
Forest National opened on 8 October 1970 with a performance by Maurice Béjart's Ballet of the 20th Century. Then it had a capacity of 5,500 seats. A renovation followed in 1995, which increased the capacity and improved lighting and sound systems.

In 2005, there were plans for a new venue on the border with Drogenbos and Sint-Pieters-Leeuw. It was to be almost twice as large (12,000 to 15,000 seats) and should have been opened in September 2010. However, on 3 September 2008, it was announced that the owner, Music Hall Group NV, had decided not to build a new concert hall.

In 2013, the Sportpaleis Group took over the operation of the hall, while Music Hall Group remained as the owners. The following year, renovations followed, with the seats numbered and new foyers provided. One of these foyers is located in an old backstage room where a 'Wall Of Fame' was created because artists wrote personal messages on the wall. This can be visited by the public. The renovation works were carried out in 2014 by Mathieu Gijbels and ABV + Architecten.

Events
Forest National has hosted sports competitions such as the Donnay Indoor Championships from 1981 to 1992 and the Belgian Basketball Cup since the 2014–15 season. It was the home arena for Brussels Royal IHSC ice hockey team.

Between 18 and 20 September 2015, in front of a total of 17,000 spectators, a new record attendance record for the Davis Cup in Belgium was set in the semi-final between Belgium and Argentina (3:2).

Noted performers

 Angèle
 ABBA
 AC/DC
 Avril Lavigne
 Axelle Red
 Björk
 Bob Dylan
 Bob Marley and the Wailers
 Bon Jovi
 Bryan Adams
 David Bowie
 Depeche Mode
 Deus
 Diana Ross
 Dire Straits
 Ed Sheeran
 Eric Clapton
 Europe
 Fall Out Boy
 Flume
 Frank Zappa
 Garou
 George Ezra
 Gloria Estefan
 Gorillaz
 Green Day
 Hooverphonic
 Indochine
 Iron Maiden
 Janet Jackson
 Jethro Tull
 Johnny Clegg
 Johnny Hallyday
 Kylie Minogue
 Lara Fabian
 Led Zeppelin
 Loïc Nottet
 Lost Frequencies
 Mariah Carey
 Marilyn Manson
 Metallica
 Michel Polnareff
 Michel Sardou
 Mika 
 Mike Oldfield 
 New Order
 Niall Horan
 Mylène Farmer
 Oasis
 Olivia Rodrigo
 Olivia Ruiz
 Ozark Henry
 Pascal Obispo
 Pink Floyd
 Phil Collins
 Queen
 Renaud
 Roxette
 Slayer
 System of a Down
 The Prodigy
 Tina Turner
 The Rolling Stones
 Taylor Swift
 Twenty One Pilots
 U2 
 Véronique Sanson 
 Neil Young

See also
 List of indoor arenas in Belgium

References

External links

  

Buildings and structures in Brussels
Sports venues in Brussels
Forest, Belgium
Culture in Brussels
Indoor arenas in Belgium